Frl. Menke  (born November 4, 1960 as Franziska Menke in Germany) was a star of the Neue Deutsche Welle genre of German popular music in the early 1980s. Menke is best known for her hit single "Hohe Berge" (High Mountains), which was a Top 10 hit in the German single charts in 1982 and has sold more than 2.5 million copies to date.

Music career
Franziska Menke is the daughter of the German songwriter, producer and publisher Joe Menke. Her debut single "Hohe Berge" became an instant success in 1982 and was one of the first songs of the Neue Deutsche Welle (NDW) popular music movement that became hugely popular in Germany in the early 1980s. Menke was one of very few female artists to succeed in the genre.

Menke's career peaked from 1982-1984 along with Neue Deutsche Welle, when she had three hit singles and released a self-titled album. She sold more than three million records during 1982 and 1983.

Menke gave birth to two children at the end of the 1980s and composed various jingles for radio stations and advertisement campaigns. In 1992 she released her second album "Ich Will's Gefährlich" with limited success.

She has re-recorded or remixed her most successful singles. In 1990 she was remixed by the German band Masterboy and in 1994 she recorded two techno music versions of "Hohe Berge" and "Tretboot in Seenot." She did another version of "Hohe Berge" for her 2005 album "Einwandfrei" and recorded an industrial version with German band "The Seven Seals" in 2007.

Trivia
 Frl. Menke still tours Germany often with other bands and singers from the Neue Deutsche Welle era.
 Frl. is the abbreviation for Fräulein, which was the German equivalent for "Miss." However, the term is rarely used in Germany these days.
 Menke was voted one of the 10 most popular singers in 1982 by German teen magazine Bravo
 Menke has starred in several musicals in Hamburg, Germany since 2001
 Her debut album was re-released on CD for the first time in 1999, containing several extended versions, B-sides of her original singles, plus two previously unreleased songs ("Du Tarzan, Ich Jane" and "Schuljungenreport")
 In 2017, she participated in German tv-show Ich bin ein Star – Holt mich hier raus!

Chart Information
 Hohe Berge: No. 10 German single charts
 Traumboy: No. 39 German single charts
 Tretboot in Seenot: No. 24 German single charts

"Hohe Berge" and "Tretboot in Seenot" still receive frequent airplay on German radio and television.

Discography

Albums
 1982 Frl. Menke
 1992 Ich Will's Gefährlich [as Franziska Menke]
 2005 Einwandfrei

Singles
 1980 Wie Du bist [as Franziska Menke]
 1982 Hohe Berge
 1982 Traumboy
 1983 Tretboot in Seenot
 1983 Messeglück in Düsseldorf
 1984 Die Ganze Nacht [as Franziska Menke]
 1990 Hohe Berge - Remix
 1992 Ich Will's Gefährlich [as Franziska Menke]
 1992 Ich Hol Doch Keine Brötchen [as Franziska Menke]
 1992 Himmel [as Franziska Menke]
 1993 Frau Neben Mir
 2010 Freunde

References

External link

German-language singers
1960 births
Living people
Menke, Frl.
Ich bin ein Star – Holt mich hier raus! participants